Ciocca is a surname. Notable people with the surname include:

 Adriano Ciocca Vasino (born 1949), Italian bishop 
 Angelo Ciocca (born 1975), Italian member of the European Parliament 
 Aníbal Ciocca (born 1915), Uruguayan football player
 Cristoforo Ciocca (1462–1542), Italian painter